Bogusław Samborski (14 April 1897 – 1971) was a Polish film actor. He appeared in more than 25 films between 1925 and 1947.

After the outbreak of World War II, he initially ran a cafe at the Polish Theater, closed after taking over the building for the occupation "Theater der Stadt Warschau" (1940). Director of this institution, Igo Sym convinced Samborski to perform in public theaters and play a role in the anti-Polish film Heimkehr. Probably Samborski decided to cooperate with him to protect his wife, who was of Jewish descent.

After Igo Sym was executed by the Polish Underground State in 1941, Samborski went to Nazi Germany, where he remained after the war. There, he continued his acting career under the pseudonym Gottlieb Sambor. In 1947, Samborski was sentenced to life in prison in absentia for collaborating with the Germans, after which he fled to Argentina.

Selected filmography
Exile to Siberia (1930)
Niebezpieczny romans (1930)
Prokurator Alicja Horn (1933)
Młody Las (1934)
Róża (1936)
Pan Twardowski (1936)
Kobiety nad przepaścią (1938)
Gehenna (1938)
Heimkehr (1941)
Shiva und die Galgenblume (1945)

References

External links

1897 births
1971 deaths
Polish male film actors
Polish male silent film actors
Male actors from Warsaw
People from Warsaw Governorate
Polish emigrants to Argentina
Polish male stage actors
20th-century Polish male actors
Polish collaborators with Nazi Germany
Nazis convicted in absentia
People convicted of treason against Poland